Petr Ondrašík (born 8 October 1951 in Brezolupy - Zlín,  TTC) is a  former Czechoslovak international speedway rider who reached the World Final four times. He rode in the United Kingdom for the Wolverhampton Wolves (1980), Eastbourne Eagles (1983) and the Birmingham Brummies (1983).

Petr, the father of former Trelawny Tigers rider Pavel Ondrašík, is now an international referee.

World Final appearances

Individual World Championship
 1978 -  London, Wembley Stadium - 16th - 0pts
 1979 -  Chorzów, Silesian Stadium - Reserve - did not ride
 1980 -  Göteborg, Ullevi - 16th - 0pts
 1984 -  Göteborg, Ullevi - 14th - 3pts

World Pairs Championship
 1973 -  Borås  (with Jiří Štancl) - 6th - 11pts (2)

World Team Cup
 1980 -  Wrocław, Olympic Stadium (with Jiří Štancl / Zdeněk Kudrna / Aleš Dryml / Václav Verner) - 4th - 12pts (3)
 1982 -  London, White City Stadium (with Jiří Štancl / Aleš Dryml / Václav Verner / Antonín Kasper, Jr.) - 4th - 17pts (0)
 1983 -  Vojens, Speedway Center (with Jiří Štancl / Aleš Dryml / Václav Verner / Antonín Kasper, Jr.) - 4th - 3pts (0)

References 

1951 births
Living people
Czechoslovak speedway riders
Wolverhampton Wolves riders
Birmingham Brummies riders
Eastbourne Eagles riders